The Pontiac 301 Turbo is an engine that Pontiac produced for the 1980 and 1981 Trans Am. The Turbo Trans Am was first added to the Pontiac model lineup in 1979 as a 1980 model year, and was the first production Pontiac V8 engine to use forced induction; in this case through an exhaust-driven turbocharging system. It was only available for the 1980 and 1981 model years, which were also the last two years of this body style of the Trans Am before it was succeeded by the all-new third-generation F-body in 1982.

Design
The 301 Turbo was unique in that it had a stronger block with thicker cylinder walls made from reinforced materials compared to the '77-'81 301 naturally aspirated low-deck block, and featured a lower compression ratio (lower compression due to the increased pressure created by the turbo system). Further it had newly developed internals such as forged pistons,  a relatively mild camshaft, a high pressure oil pump (60 psi) to ensure adequate oil to the oil-cooled Garrett TBO-305 Turbocharger, a rolled fillet crankshaft with 2 instead of 5 counterbalances, a fully baffled oil pan, and a high pressure fuel pump (10 psi), a unique single plane intake, side and turbo-specific exhaust manifolds, and an Electronic Spark Controller (ESC) using a knock sensor to retard timing when detonation is detected. 

The M4ME (E4ME for 1981) 800 cfm Rochester Quadrajet, unique to the 301 Turbo, had super rich "DX" secondary metering rods and a remote vacuum source for the primary metering rod enrichment circuit; the "PEVR" or Power Enrichment Valve Regulator. Boost was regulated by a wastegate, and was delivered to dealerships with a standard factory limit set to 9 psi (+/- 1 psi), although measured real-world factory default settings ranged from around 7 to 10 psi. The wastegate could be safely user-adjusted to 15 psi by adding alcohol or water injection, or even higher with heavier modifications.

The 301 Turbo package (RPO code LU8) required factory air conditioning (C60) due to a turbo-specific heater core box, and featured automatic transmissions (TH350 (non-lockup) for 1980, and THM350C (lock-up) for 1981) with a 3.08 positraction limited-slip differential rear axle ratio (G80).

Because the engine still used a carburetor instead of fuel injection, it could not take full advantage of the forced air through the turbocharger. The low-octane fuels used in the early 1980s could have caused severe detonation under boost, had it not been for the ESC.

See also
Pontiac V8 engine
List of GM engines

References

Pontiac engines
V8 engines